Frédéric Giacomo Testo (born 20 February 1977), known as Fred Testot, is a French actor, comedian and filmmaker. Since rising to prominence in the 2000s as he collaborated extensively with Omar Sy on the Service après-vente des émissions series on Canal+, Testot has starred in various film, theatre and television productions. He notably held the lead role in the 2017 thriller miniseries La Mante, which aired on TF1 and later premiered on Netflix.

Life and career

Born in Boulogne-Billancourt, Île-de-France and raised in Porto-Vecchio, Corsica, Testot began on Fun Radio, with Éric Judor and Ramzy Bedia (Éric et Ramzy), before appearing on Radio Nova in Jamel Debbouze's program where he met Omar Sy for the first time, in 1997.

Together, they began their television career on Canal+ on Debbouze's program, Le Cinéma de Jamel. They created Le Visiophon, d'Omar et Fred, Les sketches d'Omar et Fred and Les coming-nexts.

After a two-year hiatus, the duo returned in 2005 with a show called Service après-vente des émissions (English: "After-sales service of TV shows"). From 2006 to 2012, it became a famous daily column of Le Grand Journal, hosted by Michel Denisot.

Testot then played in several comedy movies, including Sur la piste du Marsupilami (2012), The Big Bad Wolf (2013) and Arrête ton cinéma (2016). He starred in the Netflix Original Series La Mante in 2017.

Filmography

Actor

Shows
 2006: Omar et Fred, le spectacle

References

External links

 

Living people
1977 births
French male television actors
French male film actors
French male screenwriters
French screenwriters
20th-century French male actors
21st-century French male actors